The WSK Champions Cup is a European kart racing competition organised by the WSK. Its inaugural season took place in 2014. Today, the series holds championships in three karting categories: OK, OKJ and 60 Mini.

KZ2 Champions

KF Class/OK Class Champions

KF Junior/OK Junior Class Champions

60 Mini Champions

See also 

 WSK Euro Series
 WSK Final Cup
 WSK Super Master Series

References 

European auto racing series
Recurring sporting events established in 2014